The Rock Band series of music video games supports downloadable songs for the Xbox 360, Xbox One, PlayStation 3, PlayStation 4 and Wii versions through the consoles' respective online services. Harmonix typically provides three to six new tracks per week available to all consoles as listed below. From March 2010 until September 2014, authoring groups could submit their own tracks for peer review through the Rock Band Network.

Players can download songs on a track-by-track basis, with many of the tracks also offered as part of a "song pack" or complete album, usually at a discounted rate. Tracks released for Rock Band 2 on the Wii platform are only available as singles while Rock Band 3 offers multi-song packs as well as singles. Since on-disc songs are not available for download, some albums are incomplete. For example, the album Blood Sugar Sex Magik is available for download; it contains the song "Give it Away" on Rock Band 2 and Blitz, so the downloadable album does not include "Give it Away".

Most downloadable songs are playable within every game mode, including the Band World Tour career mode. All downloadable songs released prior to October 26, 2010, are cross-compatible among Rock Band, Rock Band 2, Rock Band 3, Rock Band Blitz, and Rock Band 4, while content released between October 26, 2010 and October 5, 2015 is compatible with the latter three titles only, and all content released on or after October 6, 2015 is only compatible with Rock Band 4. Also, certain pre-Rock Band 3 songs deemed "suitable for all ages" by Harmonix are also available for use in Lego Rock Band.

The Wii version of Rock Band did not support downloadable content; however, Rock Band 2 and Rock Band 3 do, with DLC first made available in January 2009. Harmonix has said it will continue to release songs from the back catalog of downloadable content each week for Wii until all songs are available, and starting in March 2009, is making new DLC available for Wii at the same time as Xbox 360 and PlayStation 3. All songs are available for download on Wii unless otherwise noted.

After more than 5 years of uninterrupted DLC releases, Harmonix ended its regular releases of DLC on April 2, 2013 as it transitioned to other games, with the final song being Don McLean's "American Pie". Although no new DLC was scheduled for release after that date, Harmonix did not rule out the possibility of releasing DLC in the future should the right opportunity arise. On January 12, 2015, Harmonix announced the first of one-off releases of new DLC. The sudden release, along with a survey posted by Harmonix a few days later, hinted at the possibility of a new Rock Band game for eighth generation consoles. Harmonix later confirmed Rock Band 4 on March 5, 2015, and the game was released on October 6, 2015 on Xbox One and PlayStation 4.

After the initial announcement, Harmonix intended to support the Rock Band Network for Xbox 360 so long as the backend tools were still supported; however, due to technical issues and the company allocating its resources to other projects, Harmonix terminated support for the RBN in September 2014. Additionally, RBN ports to the PlayStation 3 have ended on April 2, 2013 along with regular DLC. Rock Band Network content is not forward-compatible with Rock Band 4. Harmonix stated that they would explore the logistics of bringing RBN songs over to Rock Band 4 once core DLC and previous game exports are all addressed; however, all RBN content was delisted on the Xbox 360 and PlayStation 3 platforms in February 2018. Harmonix initially reported in March 2018 that Xbox 360 users would not be able to recover their RBN content via the Xbox 360's download history due to technical issues, with Harmonix recommending that users back up their RBN song libraries to an external storage device; however, Harmonix subsequently reported in June 2018 that Xbox 360 users are now able to re-download their RBN content as needed. In May 2018, Harmonix announced that they have secured licensing for a portion of the Rock Band Network library to be released as regular DLC; however, entitlements for re-released RBN content would not be supported due to technical and licensing restrictions.

Pricing 
Individual songs are usually priced at either US$1.99/€1.49/GB£0.99, or US$1.00/€0.75/GB£0.59, with a few exceptions priced at GB£1.19 or GB£1.49/€1.99; all are available for download through PlayStation Network, Xbox Live and the Wii's online service unless otherwise noted on the list below. In the US, some downloadable songs have been available for the discounted US$0.99 price for a limited time before being raised to the standard price. From September 18, 2012 until October 6, 2015, all songs released prior to Rock Band 3's launch were reduced to US$1.00/€0.75/GB£0.59; however, with the integration of Rock Band 4's new features, Freestyle Guitar Solos and Dynamic Drum Fills, into legacy tracks, the price of all legacy DLC reverted to its original price point of US$1.99/€1.49/GB£0.99. The price for downloadable albums and song packs varies, according to how many songs are on the album or pack. Song packs containing three songs usually cost US$5.49, while song packs containing six songs cost US$9.99.

Since the introduction of Pro Instruments, extra pricing was necessary. In order to receive the Pro Guitar and Bass play, one must pay an additional US$1.00/€0.75/GB£0.59; however, certain songs or packs included the Pro Guitar for no additional charge.

In Rock Band 4, users can import previously purchased content within the same console family (i.e. Xbox One from Xbox 360 and PlayStation 4 from PlayStation 3) at no additional charge.

Complete list of available songs

The following songs have been released for the Rock Band games. All songs available in packs are also available as individual song downloads on the same date, unless otherwise noted. From May 4, 2010 to December 29, 2020, new songs were usually released on Tuesdays across all participating consoles - this cadence shifted to Thursdays starting January 7, 2021. Dates listed are the initial release of songs on Xbox Live. Starting May 20, 2008, all downloadable songs are available in both the North American and European markets, unless noted.

Some songs released before Rock Band 3 have been retrofitted to include Rock Band 3 features, including backing vocals, and the ability to buy an additional pack for Pro Guitar/Bass charts without having to buy the "RB3 Version" of the song.  Certain songs have been marked "family friendly" by Harmonix; such songs released before Rock Band 3s launch on October 26, 2010 can be played in Lego Rock Band.

Starting October 26, 2010 (with The Doors), new songs are no longer playable in Rock Band, Rock Band 2, or Lego Rock Band due to a change in the file format. All songs released via downloadable content prior to October 6, 2015 are playable in Rock Band 3, and support its new Pro Drum mode.  Most songs released for Rock Band 3 include core features for keyboards, Pro Keyboards, and backing vocals in the core song, where they are appropriate. Additionally, some of these songs features charts for Pro Guitar and Bass that can also be purchased. Songs released on and after October 6, 2015 are playable only in Rock Band 4.  In addition, all applicable songs released via downloadable content feature backing vocals when played in Rock Band 4, but no longer include keyboard or Pro Keyboard support, due to those features being removed in Rock Band 4.

Periodically, Harmonix delists songs from the Rock Band Music Store due to license expiration. As with most music licensing agreements, Rock Band's licenses for DLC have fixed terms on how long content can be sold on the platform. Harmonix announced that they will attempt to renew their license agreements, promising to give players advance notice if certain songs cannot be relicensed and must be delisted. Songs removed from the Rock Band Music Store are no longer available for new purchases; however, users who purchased songs prior to their removal from the storefront are not affected in their ability to use the content, including re-downloading songs if necessary.

Exported set lists 

In 2008, Harmonix began to offer owners of Rock Band games for Xbox 360 and PlayStation 3 the option of integrating songs from various titles in the series for use in other Rock Band games. With Rock Band 3, Wii players are also able to export songs; however, only Green Day: Rock Band and Rock Band 2 can be exported, and song files are downloaded individually.

 55 of 58 songs from Rock Band could be exported to Rock Band 2 & Rock Band 3 after purchasing a license for US$4.99. In the European version, 63 of 67 songs can be exported to Rock Band 2 while 61 can be exported to Rock Band 3. As of 2015, the ability to export Rock Band has expired.
 Each song is stored as an individual file, allowing the user to delete unwanted songs.
 "Enter Sandman", "Paranoid", "Run to the Hills" and "Monsoon" cannot be exported to any other game.
 "Rock and Roll Star" and "Hier kommt Alex" are exportable in Rock Band 2 but not Rock Band 3. Additionally, the DLC versions of these songs are unavailable in Rock Band 3.
 "Dani California" and "Black Hole Sun" were initially not compatible with Rock Band 3 until the release of a November 8, 2011 title update for the game.
 In the export for Rock Band 4, 47 of the 55 previously exportable tracks will be available in the game in the initial export package, while the remaining 8 tracks, "Blood Doll", "Brainpower", "Can't Let Go", "Day Late, Dollar Short", "I Get By", "Outside", "Pleasure (Pleasure)", and "Seven", will be made available at a later date. 
 The following Rock Band Track Packs could be exported to the main games on the Xbox 360 and PlayStation 3 for no additional cost using a one-time code printed on the back of the game's manual. Later Track Packs contained songs which were exclusive to the Track Pack disc for a limited time before being released as DLC. All of these track packs remain redeemable on Xbox platforms. As of 2020, only AC/DC Live and Track Pack Vol. 2 are redeemable on PlayStation.
 AC/DC Live (18 songs)
Track Pack Vol. 2 (20 songs)
Classic Rock Track Pack (20 songs)
Country Track Pack (21 songs)
Metal Track Pack (20 songs)
Country Track Pack 2 (21 songs)
 All 45 songs from Lego Rock Band could be exported to the main games on the Xbox 360 and PlayStation 3 after purchasing an Export License for US$9.99 using a unique code printed on the game's manual. However, as of 2015, the ability to export Lego Rock Band has expired.
 All 44 tracks from Green Day: Rock Band could be exported after purchasing an Export License for US$9.99 using a unique code printed on the game's manual. Pre-ordering the game at certain retailers allowed owners to waive this fee. The fee is also waived if one purchased the "Plus" edition of the game. As of 2015, the ability to export Green Day: Rock Band has expired.
 79 of 84 songs from Rock Band 2 could be exported to Rock Band 3 after purchasing an Export License for US$9.99. As of 2015, the ability to export Rock Band 2 has expired.
70 songs are offered in the initial export package, downloaded as a large single file for the Xbox 360 and PlayStation 3 versions and as individual song files on the Wii.
The 9 songs from Harmonix-based bands are not available in the initial export package; however, these songs are offered at no cost in the "Rock Band Free 01" pack released on January 4, 2011; this song pack is not available for Wii users.
"Battery", "Give It Away", "Spoonman", "Any Way You Want It" and "Let There Be Rock" are not available for export; however, "Give It Away" and "Spoonman" were featured as part of the Rock Band Blitz soundtrack, and the two songs were also later released as individual downloads. “Give It Away” has since been delisted as a single; “Spoonman” remains available to purchase.
The export for the Xbox 360 and PlayStation 3 versions requires the use of the unique code printed on the back of the Rock Band 2 instruction manual in order to attain an export key; this is the same code used for the redemption of the 20 bonus downloadable songs that were released shortly after Rock Band 2's launch. Prior to the export being delisted, EA support accommodated users who may have lost their previous code. On the Wii version, instead of redeeming a code to attain an export key, players only needed to have a Rock Band 2 save file present.
 All 25 songs from Rock Band Blitz are integrated into Rock Band 3 and Rock Band 4 for no additional cost. As of August 28, 2017, Rock Band Blitz and its soundtrack export are no longer available for purchase; however, the majority of individual songs will remain available for purchase as DLC for the foreseeable future.
 In the December 8, 2015 title update for Rock Band 4, verified purchasers of Rock Band 3 were able to export all 83 songs after purchasing an export license for US$14.99. As of December 1, 2020, the ability to export Rock Band 3 has expired.

Promotions 
Following the release of Rock Band, Harmonix and EA began to form partnerships with different companies and bands to provide promotional content.

 Harmonix Pack 01 was first released as part of a bonus disc included with the February 2008 issue of Official Xbox Magazine.
 "Inside the Fire" and "Indestructible" (from Disturbed Pack 01) were offered at no cost in June 2008 to customers who preordered the band's album Indestructible through Best Buy's online store.
 Crüe Fest Pack 01 was handed out as a prize in Stride's Ridiculously Long Lasting Rock Band Off, held in June 2008.
 On November 6, 2008 Harmonix began distributing 20 free downloadable songs to owners of Rock Band 2 for the Xbox 360 and PlayStation 3. The song pack could only be downloaded after redeeming a code printed inside the game's manual. These songs were released to the Wii as free downloads on January 13, 2009, and could be found in the Rock Band Music Store. Harmonix has made no announcement regarding plans to release these songs through the Music Store for the 360 or PS3. This content is playable in Rock Band, Rock Band 2 and Rock Band 3 for the 360 and PS3, with some of the content also playable in Lego Rock Band. Wii owners can only use this content in Rock Band 2 and Rock Band 3. As of 2015, the site on which the code could be redeemed was taken down. There are currently no ways to purchase this content.
 Beginning on March 24, 2009, Best Buy customers who purchased the specially-marked deluxe editions of Pearl Jam's Ten, received a promotional code that could be redeemed to download two additional live tracks ("Alive" and "State of Love and Trust"), as well as a studio version of "Brother". These songs were released to the XBLM and PSN during the week of June 22, 2009.  They were released for the Wii the following week.
 Beginning March 31, 2009, Rock Band owners who purchased specially-marked copies of Spectacular! on DVD received promotional codes which could be redeemed to download the songs "Break My Heart" and "Don't Tell Me" from the film's soundtrack.
 Target offered a version of Pearl Jam's Backspacer which includes a copy of the album for use in Rock Band games.  It was released alongside the standard edition of the album in September 2009.
 Best Buy offered limited editions of Brütal Legend which included a code to redeem for the Brütal Legend Track Pack. The song pack was released to the Rock Band Music Store on the same day.
 A listing on the Canadian website for GameStop and the UK website HMV includes a trio of songs to be handed out to customers who pre-order Rock Band 3.  Songs in this pack include "Burning Down the House" from Talking Heads, "Blue Monday" from New Order, and "My Own Summer" by Deftones. This was later confirmed in a Joystiq report.

Notes

References

External links 
 Official Rock Band series song list - Additional information for all songs featured in the Rock Band series.

Lists of video game downloadable content
Downloadable
Lists of songs by media franchise